Tang Muhan (born 4 September 2003) is a Chinese swimmer. She competed in the women's 400 metre freestyle at the 2020 Summer Olympics.

References

External links
 

2003 births
Living people
Chinese female freestyle swimmers
Olympic swimmers of China
Swimmers at the 2020 Summer Olympics
Medalists at the 2020 Summer Olympics
Olympic gold medalists for China
Olympic gold medalists in swimming
World Aquatics Championships medalists in swimming
21st-century Chinese women